Kitai is a village in  the Ruvuma Region of southwestern Tanzania. It is located along the A19 road, to the northeast of Kigonsera and Likonde.It is a notable mining location.

References

Populated places in Ruvuma Region